Arctiocossus gaerdesi is a moth in the family Cossidae described by Franz Daniel in 1956. It is found in Namibia.

The larvae feed on Zygophyllum stapffii.

References

Endemic fauna of Namibia
Cossinae
Moths described in 1956
Moths of Africa